Gregory Brian Mancz (born April 23, 1992) is an American football center for the Buffalo Bills of the National Football League. He played college football at Toledo, where he was a four-year starter at several positions along the offensive line. He earned various All-American and All-MAC honors during his college career. His senior season in 2014, he won the Vern Smith Leadership Award, which is given to the best player in the MAC. Mancz went undrafted in the 2015 NFL Draft and signed with the Texans shortly thereafter. Due to a season-ending injury to Nick Martin, Mancz was the Texans' starting center for the entire 2016 season.

Early years
Mancz was a two-year starter for the Anderson High School football team in Cincinnati, Ohio. He played in the state championship game in 2007 and 2008, with Anderson High winning the title in 2007. He played right tackle his junior season in 2008 and left tackle his senior season in 2009.

He earned First-team All-League, Second-team All-Southwest District and honorable mention All-State honors as a senior in 2009 as the team finished the season with a 12–1 record. He was team captain his senior year as well. He was also selected to play in the 2010 Ohio North-South All-Star Game and the 2010 Big 33 Classic.

In the class of 2010, he was rated a two-star recruit by Scout.com and a three-star recruit by Rivals.com. He committed to Toledo in January 2010. He also had offers from Air Force and Ohio.

College career
Mancz played for the Toledo Rockets of the University of Toledo (UT) from 2011 to 2014 and started 48 games. He was redshirted in 2010.

2011–2013
Mancz started all 13 games at right guard in 2011. He was named a First-team Freshman All-American by Yahoo! Sports and a Third-team Freshman All-American by Phil Steele. He also garnered Honorable Mention Academic All-MAC accolades. Mancz also won the Cohen Freshman of the Year Award, which is given to Toledo football's "Freshman of the Year". He again started all 13 games in 2012, earning Third-team All-MAC and Academic All-MAC honors.

In July 2013, he was named a nominee for the Allstate AFCA Good Works Team, which recognizes college football players for their community service. Mancz started 12 games in 2013, starting the first three games at right tackle before being moved back to right guard for the rest of the year. He earned Second-team All-MAC and Academic All-MAC honors. He won the team's offensive Unsung Hero Award.

2014
He moved to center for the 2014 season to replace the recently graduated Zac Kerin. In July 2014, Mancz was named to the watch lists for both the Rimington Trophy, which is given to the best center in college football, and the Lombardi Award, which is awarded to the best lineman or linebacker in college football. Also in July 2014, he was named a nominee for the Allstate AFCA Good Works Team for the second year in a row.

He started the first nine games of the regular season before missing the last three games due to a knee injury. He then returned as a starter in the team's GoDaddy Bowl victory over Arkansas State. The Rockets finished the year with a 9–4 record, including the bowl victory. The Rockets offense led the MAC in scoring offense, total offense and rushing offense in 2014.

He was named a Second-team All-American by the Football Writers Association of America (FWAA). He was the only player from the MAC to be named to the FWAA All-American team that year and was also the first Toledo player to be named an All-American since Eric Page in 2011. He also won the Vern Smith Leadership Award, which is given to the best player in the MAC. He was the first offensive lineman to ever win the Vern Smith Leadership Award and the first Toledo player since Bruce Gradkowski in 2005 to win the award. Mancz earned First-team All-MAC and Academic All-MAC honors as well. He also won Toledo football's Jim Nicholson Award, which is given to "the player contributing the most toward the success of the team". He was a team captain in 2014 and was also made a permanent team captain.

Mancz was a finalist for the 2014 Wuerffel Trophy, which is given to the college football player "who combines outstanding community service with athletic and academic achievement". He was also a semifinalist for the 2014 William V. Campbell Trophy, which is given to the best scholar-athlete in the nation. In May 2015, he received the MAC's Medal of Excellence Award, which is given annually to one male and one female member from the graduating class of each school in the conference.

Mancz accepted an invitation to play in the 2015 East-West Shrine Game as part of the West Team. However, he did not play in the game as he suffered a shoulder injury during the second day of Shrine Game practices.

Professional career

Mancz attended the 2015 NFL Combine but did not work out due to his January 2015 shoulder injury. He was rated the eighth best center in the 2015 NFL Draft by NFLDraftScout.com. Lance Zierlein of NFL.com said that "Based on Mancz's tape and history, one would have to expect that he will find a way to succeed in the league." Zierlein projected him as a sixth or seventh round pick. Chris Burke of SI.com projected Mancz as a mid to late fifth round pick.

Houston Texans
Mancz signed with the Houston Texans on May 8, 2015, after going undrafted in the 2015 Draft. He played in the first three games of the 2015 season but was inactive for the next five games. In late October, he suffered a knee injury that required surgery. He was placed on season-ending injured reserve on November 3, 2015. He was taken off injured reserve on February 8, 2016.

In August 2016, he became the team's starting center after a season-ending injury to Nick Martin. He started all 16 games for the Texans in 2016. He also started the team's two playoff games.

With Martin returning from injury in 2017, Mancz began the season as the team's primary backup along the interior of the offensive line. During the Week 1 game against the Jacksonville Jaguars on September 10, Mancz replaced starting left guard Xavier Su'a-Filo to begin the second half but was shifted to right guard after an injury to Jeff Allen. Mancz then started the Week 2 game against the Cincinnati Bengals on September 14 at right guard. On September 18, Texans head coach Bill O'Brien stated that Mancz would remain the starting right guard even if Allen is healthy. Mancz then started the Week 3 game against the New England Patriots on September 24. Mancz missed the Week 4 game against the Tennessee Titans on October 1 due to a knee injury.

On August 31, 2018, Mancz signed a two-year contract extension with the Texans through the 2020 season.

On September 5, 2020, Mancz was released by the Texans and signed to the practice squad the next day. He was elevated to the active roster on November 7, November 14, November 21, and January 2, 2021, for the team's weeks 9, 10, 11, and 17 games against the Jacksonville Jaguars, Cleveland Browns, New England Patriots, and Tennessee Titans, and reverted to the practice squad after each game. Mancz was released on January 7, 2021.

Baltimore Ravens
On January 12, 2021, Mancz signed with the practice squad of the Baltimore Ravens. On January 29, 2021, Mancz signed a reserve/futures contract with the Ravens.

Miami Dolphins
On August 28, 2021, Mancz was traded to the Miami Dolphins, along with a 2022 seventh-round pick, in exchange for a 2022 sixth-round pick. He was placed on injured reserve on November 10, 2021. He was activated on December 18.

Buffalo Bills
On March 21, 2022, Mancz signed with the Buffalo Bills. He was released on August 30, 2022, and signed to the practice squad the next day. He was released on November 17.

Cleveland Browns
On November 22, 2022, Mancz was signed to the Cleveland Browns active roster. He was released on December 23.

Minnesota Vikings
On January 3, 2023, Minnesota signed Mancz to the active roster after losing Brian O'Neill and Austin Schlottmann to injury. He was released on January 14.

Buffalo Bills (second stint)
On January 19, 2023, the Buffalo Bills signed Mancz to the practice squad. He signed a reserve/future contract on January 23, 2023.

Personal life
While at the University of Toledo, Mancz spent time as the UT Student-Athlete Advisory Council (SAAC) president, the UT vice-president for Athletes in Action and the UT vice-president for the Fellowship of Christian Athletes. He also spent time on the UT Football Team Leadership Council, the UT Football Leadership Board and the MAC Student-Athlete Advisory Committee. He participated in numerous community service events while at UT. Mancz graduated from Toledo with a degree  in finance.

References

External links
College stats

Living people
1992 births
Players of American football from Cincinnati
American football centers
American football offensive guards
American football offensive tackles
Toledo Rockets football players
Houston Texans players
Baltimore Ravens players
Miami Dolphins players
Buffalo Bills players
Cleveland Browns players
Minnesota Vikings players